"Criminal" is a song by American recording artist Fiona Apple, the third single from her debut studio album, Tidal. The single was shipped to radio on June 2, 1997, and was physically released in September. Apple has stated that the song is about "feeling bad for getting something so easily by using your sexuality". Apple's highest-charting single, it peaked at  21 on the Billboard Hot 100 (her only entry to date), as well as No. 4 on the Billboard Modern Rock Tracks.

The song won the Grammy Award for Best Female Rock Vocal Performance at the 40th Grammy Awards and was nominated for Best Rock Song. "Criminal" was listed at No. 55 on VH1's "100 Greatest Songs of the '90s", and No. 71 on Blender magazine's 2005 list of "The 500 Greatest Songs Since You Were Born".

Music video
The song's music video was directed by Mark Romanek in May 1997 with cinematography by Harris Savides. It was released a month later in June 1997. Visual enhancements including the retroreflector in Fiona's eyes and additional lighting vignettes were created by visualist Ash Beck. The video features Apple sulking in various states of undress, and The New Yorker described her as "looking like an underfed Calvin Klein model", known as the "heroin chic" look. It explores themes of voyeurism and adolescence. In 1998, the video won an MTV Video Music Award for Best Cinematography.

The video was featured in the 1997 MTV special "Beavis and Butt-Head Do Thanksgiving". Up until Beavis and Butt-Heads revival in 2011, it was the last to be critiqued by the duo, along with Marilyn Manson's "Long Hard Road Out of Hell" video, which was also featured in the special.

Track listings

 US CD, 7-inch, and cassette single "Criminal" – 5:41
 "Sleep to Dream" (live) – 4:35

 European CD single "Criminal" (album version)
 "Slow Like Honey" (live version)

 Australian CD single'''
 "Criminal" (radio edit)
 "Slow Like Honey" (live)
 "The Child Is Gone" (live)
 "Never Is a Promise" (live)

Charts

Certifications and sales

Release history

Cover versions
Singer Natalie Cole covered the song for her 20th studio album, [[Leavin' (album)|Leavin']] (2006). Len Righi of The Morning Call wrote that she was surprised at Cole's ability to transform the "agonizing, brazen lament" into "a funky, Tina Turner-type, rump-shaker".

In "Massacres and Matinees", the second episode of American Horror Story: Freak Show, Bette and Dot Tattler (played by Sarah Paulson) perform a duet version of "Criminal".

Legacy
The music video for "Criminal" was the main inspiration for It Was Romance frontperson Lane Moore's music video to her song "Hooking Up with Girls", with many visuals as well as costumes inspired by the video. "Criminal" was ranked number 423 on Rolling Stone'''s 2021 list of the "Top 500 Songs of All Time".

References

1997 singles
1997 songs
Columbia Records singles
Fiona Apple songs
Grammy Award for Best Female Rock Vocal Performance
Music videos directed by Mark Romanek
Songs written by Fiona Apple